Pampanini is a surname. Notable people with the surname include:

Renato Pampanini (1875–1949), Italian botanist and mycologist
Rosetta Pampanini (1896–1973), Italian soprano
Silvana Pampanini (1925–2016), Italian actress, director, and singer

Italian-language surnames